My First Wedding is a 2006 romantic comedy film.

Plot 
A young lady (Rachael Leigh Cook) about to be married realizes that she has a problem: she fantasizes about every man she sees. She goes to confess at church but unknowingly confesses to a young man (Kenny Doughty) who is not a priest. He agrees to help her, but falls in love with her along the way. Unfortunately, she still thinks he is a priest.

Cast 
Rachael Leigh Cook as Vanessa
Kenny Doughty as Nick
Paul Hopkins as Andre
Caroline Carver as Sandy
Valerie Mahaffey as Grace
Walter Massey as Father James
Paul Soles as Harry
Elizabeth Whitmere as Janice
Claire Brosseau as Susie
Kwasi Songui as Church Workman
Glenda Braganza as Hotel Bride

References

External links 
 
 
 
 

2006 films
2006 romantic comedy films
Canadian romantic comedy films
English-language Canadian films
Films about weddings
2000s English-language films
Films directed by Laurent Firode
2000s Canadian films